Mohamed Aziz Maswadi is a former Malaysian international lawn bowler and national coach.

Bowls career
Aziz was born in 1956 and won the bronze medal in the pairs with Mohamed Tazman Tahir at the 1998 Commonwealth Games in Kuala Lumpur. Four years later he repeated the feat by winning another bronze in the men's pairs with Safuan Said at the 2002 Commonwealth Games in Manchester.

He won the fours bronze medal at the 2001 Asia Pacific Bowls Championships, in Melbourne. In 2001, he won the gold medal in the fours event event at the 2001 Southeast Asian Games in Kuala Lumpur.

Coaching
He was the Malaysian team coach for the 2010 Commonwealth Games.

References

Living people
1956 births
Malaysian male bowls players
Bowls players at the 1998 Commonwealth Games
Bowls players at the 2002 Commonwealth Games
Commonwealth Games medallists in lawn bowls
Commonwealth Games bronze medallists for Malaysia
Southeast Asian Games medalists in lawn bowls
Competitors at the 2001 Southeast Asian Games
Southeast Asian Games gold medalists for Malaysia
Medallists at the 1998 Commonwealth Games
Medallists at the 2002 Commonwealth Games